Joseph A. Favazza is the 11th president of Saint Anselm College.

Early life and education 
Favazza is a native of Memphis, Tennessee. He earned a Bachelor of Arts degree in history from the Saint Meinrad Seminary and School of Theology. He took theology courses at the University of St. Michael's College before earning a Master of Arts and PhD in religious studies from KU Leuven. He also earned a certificate in executive management from Harvard Business School.

Career 
Favazza began his career as a professor of religious studies at Rhodes College before becoming associate vice president for academic affairs and dean of the faculty. Prior to assuming his position at Saint Anselm College, Favazza was provost and vice president for academic affairs at Stonehill College. At Stonehill, Favazza guided the restructuring of the academic programs into the Thomas and Donna May School of Arts & Sciences and the Leo J. Meehan School of Business. He also led the development of targeted graduate programs. In July 2019, Favazza was selected to serve as the 11th president of Saint Anselm.

Personal life 
Favazza is the son of Ambrose and Mary Russo Favazza. In addition to a B.A. in history from St. Meinrad College in Indiana, he holds an M.A. and Ph.D. in religious studies from the Catholic University of Louvain, Belgium. He is published on a range of topics, from the ritual practices of forgiveness and reconciliation to fundamentals in academic leadership and pedagogy. His books include The Order of Penitents: Historical Roots and Pastoral Future; Removing the Barriers: The Practice of Reconciliation; A Reconciliation Sourcebook; and From Cloister to Commons: Concepts and Models for Service-Learning in Religious Studies. 

Favazza's wife, Dr. Paddy Cronin Favazza, is a professor and researcher in the field of early childhood education. The couple have four children, including three adopted from Romania.

References 

Living people
Saint Anselm College faculty
People from Memphis, Tennessee
Religious studies scholars
Saint Meinrad Seminary and School of Theology alumni
KU Leuven alumni
Year of birth missing (living people)